Edge West is an American film and television development and production company founded by Peabody Award and Emmy Award winning producer/director/writer,  Philip J Day.

Formed in 2008, Edge West develops and produces movies and television for the US domestic and international markets. The company's latest movie production, The Russian Bride, starring Corbin Bernsen and Kristina Pimenova, will be released in March 2019 by VMI Distribution. Euroclub (2016) and The Amityville Terror (2016), produced by Philip J Day and Edge West Productions, are distributed by UnCork'd Entertainment and continue to sell in markets around the world.

In 2018 Edge West co-produced with National Geographic a multi-part TV series, 'San Diego: City of Adventure', with Philip J Day as Executive Producer. The company has produced movies, TV series, and documentaries since it was founded.

The company's first production The Real Roswell has been aired regularly since it premiered in 2008. Tunnel to a Lost World was voted  'Best Documentary of the Year' by an audience poll in Turkey, the country where the film was made. In 2009 The Skyjacker That Got Away was the best rated program ever on the long-running series 'Undercover History' for National Geographic.

Edge West has produced three feature films for the international and domestic market, sixteen documentaries and three multi-part TV series for National Geographic Channel. The company produced a one hour special for PBS Inside:Rio Carnivale  Edge West also produced a one-hour special, Volcano Timebomb for Curiosity on Discovery Channel, which aired on December 9, 2012.

Awards
The Skyjacker That Got Away is the story of D. B. Cooper, a man who has eluded the FBI for over thirty years. Four of the crew, including Philip J Day, were nominated for an Emmy Award at the 2010 News and Documentary Emmy Awards  in the class of Outstanding Individual Achievement: Lighting Direction & Scenic Design.

As well as the Emmy nomination, the company has won 13 Telly Awards between 2008 and 2018.

President of Edge West, Philip J Day, is a multi-award-winning producer and director. His films have been recognized with a Peabody, two Emmy's, five Emmy nominations and eighteen Telly Awards  His series on Lyndon B. Johnson's secret and illegal White House tape recordings began with "Hello Mr President". The long running series "The White House Tapes: Johnson Tapes" went on to win multiple awards including an Emmy Award, three EMMY nominations and a Peabody Award.

Festivals
Edge West's The Russian Bride, starring Corbin Bernsen and Kristina Pimenova, played at the Cinepocalypse Festival in Chicago on June 26, 2018. The movie has been chosen to close the Fanasporto Festival on March 2, 2019.

Filmography 

 "The Russian Bride" (2019) Independent Movie
 "San Diego: City of Adventure" (2018) National Geographic
 "The Amityville Terror" (2016) Independent Movie
 "Euroclub" (2016) Independent Movie
 "Party Like the Rich and Famous" (2012) National Geographic
 "Party Like the Queen of France" (2012) National Geographic
 "Party Like a Roman Emperor" (2012) National Geographic
 "Volcano Time Bomb" (2012) Discovery Channel
 "Vanished From Alcatraz" (2011) National Geographic
 "Crime Lords of Tokyo" (2011) National Geographic
 "Nasca Lines The Buried Secrets" (2010) National Geographic
 "Born To Rage?" (2010) National Geographic
 "Great Escape The Final Secrets" (2009) National Geographic
 "The Skyjacker That Got Away" (2009) National Geographic
 "Lost Cities of the Amazon" (2008) National Geographic
 "Tunnel to a Lost World" (2008) National Geographic
 "Inside Rio Carnaval" (2007) PBS
 "The Real Roswell" (2007) National Geographic

External links
 Edge West Productions

References

Television production companies of the United States
Film production companies of the United States
Mass media companies established in 2008
Companies based in Los Angeles County, California